The Portrait of Isabella d'Este is a drawing (and possible painting) by Leonardo da Vinci which was executed between 1499 and 1500. It depicts Isabella d'Este, Marchioness of Mantua. During the Italian Wars of 1499–1504, the French invaded Italy which caused Leonardo to flee from Milan toward Mantua. There he had met Isabella, where she commissioned her portrait from him. Whether Leonardo completed the portrait is unknown. There is evidence through letters of the time that he held a fully completed painting of her but they are vague in describing it. It is possible that the painting was lost to time or that it was in fact never completed at all. A version of the portrait in oils on canvas was found in a collection in Switzerland in 2015 but it has yet to be verified.

See also 
 Portrait of Isabella d'Este (Titian)

References

External links 
 

Drawings by Leonardo da Vinci
Drawings of the Louvre